Euphorbia oblongata is a species of spurge known by the common names Balkan spurge, eggleaf spurge and oblong spurge. It is native to Eurasia but can be found elsewhere as a weedy introduced species. This is a hairy perennial herb growing to maximum heights of just over half a metre. It has oval-shaped or narrow leaves with finely toothed edges which are 4 to 6 centimetres long. The foliage is green to yellow-green. The inflorescences hold tiny glandular flowers. The fruit is a spherical capsule about half a centimetre long which contains smooth brown seeds.

References

External links
Jepson Manual Treatment
USDA Plants Profile
Photo gallery

oblongata